Babiole was a French privateer launched at La Ciotat in 1811. She made four cruises between 1811 and 1813 in the Mediterranean as a privateer, capturing a number of prizes. The British Royal Navy captured her in 1815. She might have been a balaou, a type of schooner.

Career
On her first cruise, from 1811 to early 1812, Babiole, of Marseille, on 25 January 1811 captured Admiral Saumarez, of 120 tons. Admiral Saumarez had been sailing from Newfoundland with a cargo of fish when Babiole captured her off Alicante. Admiral Saumarez arrived at Agde on 2 February.

Babioles second cruise took place from about March 1812 to later in the year. Babiole sailed from Frioul on 18 February 1812 and proceeded to take a number of prizes. On 24 February she captured a Spanish brig carrying salt fish from Alicante to Majorca. Then on 9 March, Babiole captured the English brig Malta, which was coming from Palma. Babiole took her cargo of three bales of silk and let Malta proceed. On 16 March, Babiole captured the Spanish vessel Nuestra Senora de Carmes, which had been carrying paper and brandy from Vila Nova to Cadiz. Babiola sent her to Barcelona. That same day Babiole captured the English bombard Gibraltar, which had been sailing from Gibraltar to Majorca, but could not take possession as a British warship appeared in sight. Lastly Babiole captured the English brig Commerce, which was carrying coffee, soldiers' clothing, and merchandise. Commerce had come from London and was in a convoy sailing to Malta and Messina when Babiole captured her. Babiole sent Commerce into Toulon.

Babioles third cruise, which was under the command of Jean-Joseph Roux and commissioned by Balguerie the Elder from Marseille, took place between December 1812 and March 1813. On 1 December Babiole captured Sisters, which was sailing from London to Malta. Sisters arrived at Ajaccio on 13 December. Sisters was a 12-gun three-masted ship, under William Young, with 30 men and 3 passengers that ferried sugar, coffee, and various other goods. On 21 January 1813, Babiole captured the 2-gun British brig St Jean Baptiste, Francesco Nadeslech master, which was sailing from Majorca to Alicante without a cargo, and released her as a cartel.

Captain Roux again commanded Babiole on her fourth cruise, which took place between October 1813 to January 1814. On 1 October Babiole. after a brief exchange of gunfire, captured the British merchant corvette , Clement Worts, master, which had been sailing from Smyrna. She had been loading silk, "Near eastern antiques", gaiac wood, and sponges. Babiole brought her into Corsica on 11 November. On 5 November Babiole captured the British brig Vigilant, Guillaume (William?) Fowler, master, of 14 men, which was sailing from Smyrna to Liverpool loaded with alizarin and wood. Babiole took Vigilant into Genoa.

Next, Babiole captured the British schooner London Packet, Richard Holman, master, which had been sailing from Palermo to London with a load of oil, macaron, and anchovies described as low in value in French logs. Babiole plundered London Packet and then released her. She carried two guns and a 10-man crew.) Roux had the prisoners of Gallant Schemer and Vigilant transferred on London Packet and released her as a cartel; she arrived at Milford in December 1814.

Babiole captured the British merchant corvette , Benjamin Francis, master, on 26 November 1813 as Otter was sailing back to London from Smyrna with a load of dried fruits. Otter arrived at Toulon on 5 December. She had a 14-man crew and 6 guns.

Fate
On 1 May 1815, during the Hundred Days, Babiole was returning to Bordeaux from Martinique when  detained her. Babiole arrived at Portsmouth on 21 May 1815. The capture took place in the Bay of Biscay and her cargo reportedly was worth £30,000.

Babiole was released.

Notes, citations, and references
Notes

Citations

References
 
 

1811 ships
Ships built in France
Privateer ships of France
Captured ships